Erachichor,  also spelt Erachi Choru or Irachichoru is a traditional meat-rice dish in Kerala cuisine. Erachichor is popular mainly in the Malabar region of Kerala, India. Erachichor is often mistaken as Biryani because of similarity in appearance, but the preparation method and taste of the dish is different from that of Biryani. Unlike Biryani, Erachichor is cooked in mud pot, and steamed with banana leaf covering.

References

Indian cuisine
Kerala cuisine
Indian rice dishes
Indian meat dishes